Not a Dirty Film is a 2015 Bengali crime-romance film directed by Ranadeep Sarkar starring Saheb Bhattacharya, Mumtaz Sorcar, Rajatava Dutta, Ena Saha and Kharaj Mukherjee in lead roles. The film received poor critical reviews.

Cast
Saheb Bhattacharya
Mumtaz Sorcar
Ena Saha
Rajatava Dutta
Kharaj Mukherjee

Soundtrack

Track list

References

External links
 

Bengali-language Indian films
2010s Bengali-language films
Romantic crime films